Alan Ira Abramowitz (born December 1, 1947) is an American political scientist and author, known for his research and writings on American politics, elections in the United States, and political parties in the United States.

Early life
Abramowitz graduated with a B.A. with high honors in political science from the University of Rochester in 1969. He attended graduate school at Stanford University, completing an M.A. in 1972 and a Ph.D. in 1976. Abramowitz' dissertation was entitled An Assessment of Party and Incumbent Accountability in Midterm Congressional Elections.

Career
Abramowitz taught at the College of William and Mary from 1976 to 1982 and at Stony Brook University from 1982 to 1987. He then joined the faculty at Emory University as a professor of political science. Abramowitz was awarded the Alben W. Barkley Distinguished Chair in Political Science at Emory University in 1993.

Abramowitz has authored or co-authored five books. His 1992 book co-authored with Jeff Segal of Stony Brook University, Senate Elections, written in 1992, received two awards from political science associations and remains one of the seminal works in the study of senatorial elections to this day. Abramowitz has written extensively on many disparate topics in American politics, including presidential, Senate and House of Representatives elections, activism, polarization, ideology, partisanship, ideological realignment, incumbency, and redistricting.

Time-for-change model
In 1988, Abramowitz devised a model, which he termed the "time-for-change model", for predicting the outcome of the popular vote in United States presidential elections. The model makes its prediction based on only three inputs: "the growth rate of the economy during the second quarter of the election year, the incumbent president's approval rating at mid-year, and the length of time the incumbent president's party has controlled the White House." The last of these is what Abramowitz dubbed "the time-for-change factor", arguing that the longer a political party controls the presidency, the more likely the other party will be to win it back, since "voters attach a positive value to periodic alternation in power by the two major parties".

Abramowitz's model was correct in every presidential election from 1988 until 2016, when it predicted that Donald Trump would win the popular vote; he lost the popular vote to Hillary Clinton, although he did win the Electoral College. In May 2016, Abramowitz had predicted that Clinton would win the popular vote by an even larger margin, stating that his model assumed that both political parties would nominate mainstream candidates and that Trump broke this assumption.

Select publications
Books
 
 
 
Available online as:  Project Muse.
 
 
 
 

Journal articles
 
 
  Pdf.
 
 
  Abstract.

References

Sources
Emory Department of Political Science: Alan I. Abramowitz
Curriculum vitae: Alan I. Abramowitz

American political scientists
Living people
1947 births
Emory University faculty
University of Rochester alumni
Stanford University School of Humanities and Sciences alumni
College of William & Mary faculty
Stony Brook University faculty